Keyi Lu is a station on Line 9 of the Beijing Subway. It is located along the north-south Keyi Road just north of the South 4th Ring Road West.

Station Layout 
The station has an underground island platform.

Exits 
There are 4 exits, lettered A, B, C, and D. Exits A and C are accessible.

References

External links 

Beijing Subway stations in Fengtai District
Railway stations in China opened in 2011